Lori McNeil and Martina Navratilova were the defending champions but they competed with different partners that year, McNeil with Kathy Foxworth and Navratilova with Hana Mandlíková.

Foxworth and McNeil lost in the second round to Catherine Suire and Patricia Tarabini.

Mandlíková and Navratilova won in the final 6–4, 6–1 against Mary Lou Daniels and Wendy White.

Seeds
Champion seeds are indicated in bold text while text in italics indicates the round in which those seeds were eliminated. The top four seeded teams received byes into the second round.

Draw

Final

Top half

Bottom half

References
 1989 Family Circle Cup Doubles Draw

Charleston Open
1989 WTA Tour